Suhail Koya is a Malayalam lyricist and screenwriter. He made his debut as a lyricist through Mosayile Kuthira Meenukal. His song "Jaathikkathottam" from Thanneer Mathan Dinangal grabbed critical acclamation.

He is the co-writer of upcoming Malayalam film Qalb.

Career 
Suhail Koya is from Alappuzha and had his Masters in Business Administration from England, currently active as screenwriter / lyricist in Malayalam cinema.

He along with Sajid Yahiya creates the screenplay of upcoming Malayalam film Qalb.

Discography

References

External links 

 

Living people
Indian male screenwriters
Screenwriters from Kerala
Indian lyricists
Year of birth missing (living people)